The 1907 VMI Keydets football team represented the Virginia Military Institute (VMI) in their 17th season of organized football. Coached by Charles Roller (VMI class of 1901), the Keydets went 5–3.

Schedule

Roster

References

VMI
VMI Keydets football seasons
VMI Keydets football